The 1989–90 FIS Ski Jumping World Cup was the 11th World Cup season in ski jumping. It began in Thunder Bay, Canada on 3 December 1989 and finished in Planica, Yugoslavia on 25 March 1990. The individual World Cup was won by Ari-Pekka Nikkola and Nations Cup by Austria.

Map of world cup hosts 
All 19 locations which have been hosting world cup events for men this season. Events in Bærum and Falun were completely canceled.

 Four Hills Tournament
 Swiss Tournament
 Bohemia Tournament

Calendar

Men

Standings

Overall

Nations Cup

Four Hills Tournament

References 

World cup
World cup
FIS Ski Jumping World Cup